Denis Bowes Daly PC (c. 1745 – 17 December 1821), was an Irish politician.

Daly was the eldest son of Hyacynth Daly of Dalystown, and his cousin Rose Daly of Raford, both of County Galway and educated privately in Dublin and at Trinity College, Dublin.

After serving as High Sheriff of King's County for 1774 he was brought into the Irish parliament by his cousin, Denis Daly of Dunsandle. There he served as MP for Galway Borough from 1776 to 1790 and for King's County from 1790 to 1800. A constant supporter of the Ponsonby's, he voted for catholic relief in 1778 and 1793, the implicit repeal of Poynings' Law in 1782, and for commercial propositions in 1785. He was an agent for Viceroy William Fitzwilliam, 4th Earl Fitzwilliam in attempting to persuade John Beresford to accept a pension, thus leaving office without scandal. Daly strongly opposed the Acts of Union 1800, co-ordinating the factions against the government.

After the acts were passed he represented King's County (now Offaly) (1801–02), Galway Borough (1802-05) and County Galway (1805–18). He was sworn of the Irish Privy Council on 7 June 1806.

In 1780 he had married Mary Charlotte Ponsonby, daughter of John Ponsonby and Lady Elizabeth Cavendish, and sister of George Ponsonby. However she died a year after the marriage, after which Daly refused to leave his house for more than twelve months.

References

 The Lords of Dunsandle, James Noel Dillon, in  Kiltullagh/Killimordaly: As the Centuries passed: A history from 1500-1900, pp. 43–67, ed. Kieran Jordan, 2000.
 Clare bards, Galway gentry, Patrick Melvin, The Irish Genealogist, 2002
 The Daly Chronicle, Dermot Daly,The Irish Genealogist, 2002
 Dictionary of Irish Biography, p. 19, Cambridge, 2010

External links 

1740s births
1821 deaths
Politicians from County Galway
Members of the Privy Council of Ireland
High Sheriffs of King's County
Irish MPs 1776–1783
Irish MPs 1783–1790
Irish MPs 1790–1797
Irish MPs 1798–1800
Members of the Parliament of the United Kingdom for County Galway constituencies (1801–1922)
Members of the Parliament of the United Kingdom for King's County constituencies (1801–1922)
UK MPs 1801–1802
UK MPs 1802–1806
UK MPs 1806–1807
UK MPs 1807–1812
UK MPs 1812–1818
Alumni of Trinity College Dublin
Members of the Parliament of Ireland (pre-1801) for County Galway constituencies
Members of the Parliament of Ireland (pre-1801) for King's County constituencies
Mayors of Galway